Hans Blumenfeld,  (October 18, 1892 – January 30, 1988) was a German Canadian architect and city planner.

Blumenfeld published many articles on economic and social effects of planning with the emphasis on interdependence of physical, social and economic renewal. In 1967 his book The Modern Metropolis, Its Origins, Growth, Characteristics, and Planning: Selected Essays by Hans Blumenfeld was published. In 1987, his book Life Begins at 65: The Not Entirely Candid Autobiography of a Drifter was published.  In 1978, he was made an Officer of the Order of Canada.

References

 "Hans Blumenfeld 1892–1988"—Peace magazine biography
 Hans Blumenfeld at The Canadian Encyclopedia
 in German, at Karlsruher Institut für Technologie, Institut für Kunst- und Baugeschichte, by Claudia Bothe, n. d. 

1892 births
1988 deaths
Canadian architects
Canadian urban planners
19th-century German architects
Officers of the Order of Canada
German emigrants to Canada
Architects from Osnabrück